In category theory, a branch of mathematics, a monad (also triple, triad, standard construction and fundamental construction) is a monoid in the category of endofunctors. An endofunctor is a functor mapping a category to itself, and a monad is an endofunctor together with two natural transformations required to fulfill certain coherence conditions.  Monads are used in the theory of pairs of adjoint functors, and they generalize closure operators on partially ordered sets to arbitrary categories. Monads are also useful in the theory of datatypes, the denotational semantics of imperative programming languages, and in functional programming languages, allowing languages with non-mutable states to do things such as simulate for-loops; see Monad (functional programming).

Introduction and definition 

A monad is a certain type of endofunctor. In general, adjunctions are not equivalences—they relate categories of different natures. The monad theory matters as part of the effort to capture what it is that adjunctions 'preserve'.

Formal definition

Throughout this article  denotes a category. These are required to fulfill the following conditions (sometimes called coherence conditions):

We can rewrite these conditions using the following commutative diagrams:

The power set monad

For every set , we have a map , which assigns to every  the singleton . The function

takes a set of sets to its union. These data describe a monad.

Remarks
The axioms of a monad are formally similar to the monoid axioms. In fact, monads are special cases of monoids, namely they are precisely the monoids among endofunctors , which is equipped with the multiplication given by composition of endofunctors.

Composition of monads is not, in general, a monad. For example, the double power set functor  does not admit any monad structure.

Comonads 
The categorical dual definition is a formal definition of a comonad (or cotriple); this can be said quickly in the terms that a comonad for a category  is a monad for the opposite category  .

Monads are to monoids as comonads are to comonoids. Every set is a comonoid in a unique way, so comonoids are less familiar in abstract algebra than monoids; however, comonoids in the category of vector spaces with its usual tensor product are important and widely studied under the name of coalgebras.

Terminological history
The notion of monad was invented by Roger Godement in 1958 under the name "standard construction". Monad has been called "dual standard construction", "triple", "monoid" and "triad". The term "monad" is used at latest 1967, by Jean Bénabou.

Examples

Identity

The identity functor on a category  is a monad.

Monads arising from adjunctions

Any adjunction

gives rise to a monad on C. This very widespread construction works as follows: the endofunctor is the composite

This endofunctor is quickly seen to be a monad, where the unit map stems from the unit map  of the adjunction, and the multiplication map is constructed using the counit map of the adjunction:

In fact, any monad can be found as an explicit adjunction of functors using the Eilenberg–Moore category  (the category of -algebras).

Double dualization
The double dualization monad, for a fixed field k arises from the adjunction

where both functors are given by sending a vector space V to its dual vector space . The associated monad sends a vector space V to its double dual .

Closure operators on partially ordered sets

Free-forgetful adjunctions
For example, let  be the forgetful functor from the category Grp of groups to the category Set of sets, and let   be the free group functor from the category of sets to the category of groups. In this case, the associated monad  takes a set  and returns the underlying set of the free group .
The unit map of this monad is given by the maps

including any set  into the set  in the natural way, as strings of length 1. Further, the multiplication of this monad is the map

made out of a natural concatenation or 'flattening' of 'strings of strings'.  This amounts to two natural transformations.
The preceding example about free groups can be generalized to any type of algebra in the sense of a variety of algebras in universal algebra.  Thus, every such type of algebra gives rise to a monad on the category of sets.  Importantly, the algebra type can be recovered from the monad (as the category of Eilenberg–Moore algebras), so monads can also be seen as generalizing varieties of universal algebras.

Another monad arising from an adjunction is when  is the endofunctor on the category of vector spaces which maps a vector space  to its tensor algebra , and which maps linear maps to their tensor product.

Codensity monads

Under mild conditions, functors not admitting a left adjoint also give rise to a monad, the so-called codensity monad. For example, the inclusion

does not admit a left adjoint.

Monads used in denotational semantics

The following monads over the category of sets are used in denotational semantics of imperative programming languages, and analogous constructions are used in functional programming.

The maybe monad

The endofunctor of the maybe or partiality monad adds a disjoint point:

The unit is given by the inclusion of a set  into :

In both functional programming and denontational semantics, the maybe monad models partial computations, that is, computations that may fail.

The state monad

Given a set , the endofunctor of the state monad maps each set  to the set of functions . The component of the unit at  maps each element  to the function

In functional programming and denotational semantics, the state monad models stateful computations.

The environment monad

Given a set , the endofunctor of the reader or environment monad maps each set  to the set of functions . Thus, the endofunctor of this monad is exactly the hom functor . The component of the unit at  maps each element  to the constant function .

In functional programming and denotational semantics, the environment monad models computations with access to some read-only data.

The list and set monads

The list or nondeterminism monad maps a set X to the set of finite sequences (i.e., lists) with elements from X. The unit maps an element x in X to the singleton list [x].

In functional programming, the list monad is used to model nondeterministic computations. The covariant powerset monad is also known as the set monad, and is also used to model nondeterministic computation.

Algebras for a monad 

More formally, a -algebra   is an object  of  together with an arrow  of  called the structure map of the algebra such that the diagrams

commute.

Examples

Algebras over the free group monad 
For example, for the free group monad discussed above, a -algebra is a set  together with a map from the free group generated by  towards  subject to associativity and unitality conditions. Such a structure is equivalent to saying that  is a group itself.

Algebras over the distribution monad 
Another example is the distribution monad  on the category of sets. In set-builder notation, this is the setBy inspection of the definitions, it can be shown that algebras over the distribution monad are equivalent to convex sets, i.e., sets equipped with operations  for  subject to axioms resembling the behavior of convex linear combinations  in Euclidean space.

Algebras over the symmetric monad 
Another useful example of a monad is the symmetric algebra functor on the category of -modules for a commutative ring .sending an -module  to the direct sum of symmetric tensor powerswhere . For example,  where the -algebra on the right is considered as a module. Then, an algebra over this monad are commutative -algebras.

Commutative algebras in E-infinity ring spectra 
There is an analogous construction for commutative -algebraspg 113 which gives commutative -algebras for a commutative -algebra . If  is the category of -modules, then the functor  is the monad given bywhere -times. Then there is an associated category  of commutative -algebras from the category of algebras over this monad.

Monads and adjunctions 
As was mentioned above, any adjunction gives rise to a monad. Conversely, every monad arises from some adjunction, namely the free–forgetful adjunction

whose left adjoint sends an object X to the free T-algebra T(X). An initial object is the Kleisli category, which is by definition the full subcategory of  consisting only of free T-algebras, i.e., T-algebras of the form  for some object x of C.

Monadic adjunctions

Given any adjunction  with associated monad T, the functor G can be factored as

i.e., G(Y) can be naturally endowed with a T-algebra structure for any Y in D. The adjunction is called a monadic adjunction if the first functor  yields an equivalence of categories between D and the Eilenberg–Moore category . By extension, a functor  is said to be monadic if it has a left adjoint  forming a monadic adjunction.  For example, the free–forgetful adjunction between groups and sets is monadic, since algebras over the associated monad are groups, as was mentioned above. In general, knowing that an adjunction is monadic allows one to reconstruct objects in D out of objects in C and the T-action.

Beck's monadicity theorem

Beck's monadicity theorem gives a necessary and sufficient condition for an adjunction to be monadic. A simplified version of this theorem states that G is monadic if it is conservative (or G reflects isomorphisms, i.e., a morphism in D is an isomorphism if and only if its image under G is an isomorphism in C) and C has and G preserves coequalizers.

For example, the forgetful functor from the category of compact Hausdorff spaces to sets is monadic. However the forgetful functor from all topological spaces to sets is not conservative since there are continuous bijective maps (between non-compact or non-Hausdorff spaces) that fail to be homeomorphisms. Thus, this forgetful functor is not monadic.
The dual version of Beck's theorem, characterizing comonadic adjunctions, is relevant in different fields such as topos theory and topics in algebraic geometry related to descent. A first example of a comonadic adjunction is the adjunction

for a ring homomorphism  between commutative rings. This adjunction is comonadic, by Beck's theorem, if and only if B is faithfully flat as an A-module. It thus allows to descend B-modules, equipped with a descent datum (i.e., an action of the comonad given by the adjunction) to A-modules. The resulting theory of faithfully flat descent is widely applied in algebraic geometry.

Uses 

Monads are used in functional programming to express types of sequential computation (sometimes with side-effects). See monads in functional programming, and the more mathematically oriented Wikibook module b:Haskell/Category theory.

Monads are used in the denotational semantics of impure functional and imperative programming languages.

In categorical logic, an analogy has been drawn between the monad-comonad theory, and modal logic via closure operators, interior algebras, and their relation to models of S4 and intuitionistic logics.

Generalization
It is possible to define monads in a 2-category .

See also 
 Distributive law between monads
 Lawvere theory
 Monad (functional programming)
 Polyad
 Strong monad

References

Further reading

External links 
Monads, five short lectures (with one appendix).
John Baez's This Week's Finds in Mathematical Physics (Week 89) covers monads in 2-categories.

Adjoint functors
Category theory